Chang Min-jung (born 1 February 1972) is a Taiwanese bobsledder. He competed at the 1992 Winter Olympics and the 1994 Winter Olympics.

References

1972 births
Living people
Taiwanese male bobsledders
Olympic bobsledders of Taiwan
Bobsledders at the 1992 Winter Olympics
Bobsledders at the 1994 Winter Olympics
Place of birth missing (living people)
20th-century Taiwanese people